The Solid Waste Association of North America (SWANA) is a professional organization for solid waste management in North America, with chapters throughout the United States, Canada, and the Caribbean.

Membership 
Membership includes seven technical divisions. These technical divisions provide members with the most convenient methods to keep track of hot topics, connect with experts, and shape the future of solid waste management. Access to each division's electronic forum encourages networking across the United States and Canada, allowing members to access resources and get answers to questions. 
SWANA currently has 47 local chapters in which attendees can participate in forums, training sessions, local legislation, and networking.

SWANA provides solid waste training throughout North America for facility policy-makers, managers, owners and operators, and industry consultants. SWANA also hosts several conferences and events throughout the year providing members and other industry professionals the opportunity to meet with their peers, share ideas and discuss solutions.

See also
Chartered Institute of Wastes Management CIWM
International Solid Waste Association ISWA
Waste management

References

 

"Solid Waste Association of North America (SWANA)." Encyclopedia of Associations: National Organizations of the U.S., edited by Tara E. Atterberry, 57th ed., Gale, 2018. Gale Directory Library, https://link.gale.com/apps/doc/TFGLXV945184846/GDL?u=tplmain&sid=bookmark-GDL&xid=3cc2978b. Accessed 17 July 2021.

External links

Professional associations based in the United States
Waste organizations
Waste in the United States